Christopher Dwight Fontenot (born July 11, 1974) is a former American football tight end. He played for the Philadelphia Eagles in 1998.

References

1974 births
Living people
American football tight ends
McNeese Cowboys football players
Philadelphia Eagles players